Sergeant Thomas James Harris VC MM (30 January 1892 – 9 August 1918) was a British Army soldier and an English recipient of the Victoria Cross (VC), the highest and most prestigious award for gallantry in the face of the enemy that can be awarded to British and Commonwealth forces.

Son of William John and Sarah Ann Harris of Rochester He was 26 years old, and a serjeant in the 6th (Service) Battalion, Queen's Own Royal West Kent Regiment, British Army during the First World War. On 9 August 1918 at Morlancourt, France, he performed the deeds for which he was awarded the Victoria Cross.

Citation

The medal
His VC is displayed at The Queen's Own Royal West Kent Regiment Museum, Maidstone, Kent.

References
Profile

1892 births
1918 deaths
British Army personnel of World War I
British military personnel killed in World War I
British World War I recipients of the Victoria Cross
People from Medway
Queen's Own Royal West Kent Regiment soldiers
Recipients of the Military Medal
British Army recipients of the Victoria Cross
Military personnel from Kent